Bondia is a genus of moths in the Carposinidae family.

Species
Bondia attenuatana Meyrick, 1882
Bondia caseata Meyrick, 1910
Bondia comonana (Kearfott, 1907)
Bondia crescentella Walsingham, 1882
Bondia digramma Meyrick, 1910
Bondia dissolutana Meyrick, 1882
Bondia fidelis Meyrick, 1913
Bondia fuscata Davis, 1969
Bondia maleficana Meyrick, 1882
Bondia nigella Newman, 1856
Bondia shastana Davis, 1969
Bondia spicata Davis, 1969

References

Natural History Museum Lepidoptera generic names catalog

Carposinidae